Ruth Culbertson Samuelson (November 4, 1959 – January 23, 2017) was a Republican member of the North Carolina General Assembly, representing the 104th district in the North Carolina House of Representatives from 2007 to 2015. From 2000 to 2004, Samuelson served as a member of the Mecklenburg County Board of Commissioners, representing the Fifth District. In 2004, she ran for an At-Large seat on the Board of Commissioners, but lost in a tight general election race.

In November 2006, Samuelson was elected to the North Carolina House succeeding five-term incumbent Ed McMahan. Samuelson was elected with 67% of the vote in the election, beating Democrat Paula McSwain.

She announced on October 15, 2013, that she would not seek re-election for a fifth term and would leave office at the end of her current term, after the 2014 elections.

Samuelson revealed in June 2016 that she had been diagnosed with ovarian cancer. Later that year she entered hospice care at home.

Samuelson died on January 23, 2017, at the age of 57.
A hiking trail in Mecklenburg County has been named in Samuelson's honor.

Electoral history

2012

2010

2008

2006

References

|-

1959 births
2017 deaths
People from Charleston, South Carolina
Politicians from Charleston, South Carolina
People from Charlotte, North Carolina
Politicians from Charlotte, North Carolina
University of North Carolina at Chapel Hill alumni
21st-century American politicians
21st-century American women politicians
Women state legislators in North Carolina
County commissioners in North Carolina
Republican Party members of the North Carolina House of Representatives
Deaths from cancer in North Carolina
Deaths from ovarian cancer